Karikkottakary is a small town located  east of Iritty in Kannur district,  Kerala state. Karikkotakari revenue village is formed on 26th February 2021 by trifurcating Aralam and Ayyankunnu villages.

History
The modern history of this town starts with the arrival of migrants from Kottayam district of Kerala during 1948 soon after the independence of India. The migration to this place started with the arrival of Kavungal Ulahannan and his family popularly known as Thalukandathil family or Thalukandam, a name which they got after the place where they settled first. The following years witnessed the arrival of  kunnel family,Kandathil family, Vazhamplackal family, Themanayil family,kalarupara family,Mangalathil family, Thadathil family, Vattolil family, Poothottal (pathazhapura) family, Koyikkalat family, Pulickakunnel family, Padinjaramuriyil family, Unnimakkal family etc. The hard work of the migrants made Karikkottakary a small town with almost all facilities to meet the basic needs of its population. St Thomas church is the main attraction.
The human settlement in fact is much older in Karikkottakari as there is evidence of prehistoric habitation in the form of urn burials that were unearthed while repairing the Karikkottakkari-Edappuzha road in the mid 1970s. This particular spot where the historical relics have been unearthed is hardly 200 meters away from the centre of the Karikkottakkari town.
There is also a Pentecostal Church of the Assemblies of God in India.

Migration from Travancore
It is difficult to pronounce the history of modern town of Karikkottakkari beginning just with the arrival of migrants from Travancore although it is an important moment. There must have been Adivasi community of Paniyars living in the area who perhaps worked for the Malabar Jenmis who cleared the forest land that karikkottakari was, once.

Poaching elephants
Similarly, the Paniyars also provided physical labour in works related to the capture of elephants. There were a lot of pitches for trapping elephants in the settlements surrounding karikkottari that were very visible even as late as the 1970s.  The proletarianisation of the Paniyars is evidenced by the fact that right from the 19th century they were proletarinsed in Wayanad and the adjoining areas of the present day Kannur and Kozhikode districts. It seems that the Paniyars became highly exploited and marginalised with the arrival of migrant peasants in the mid-twentieth century and their marginality continues to this day.  The late 1940s also witnessed the migration of Dalit Christians to Karikkottakkari area from various parts of Kottayam district who had desired to acquire land and improve their economic and social conditions. In their ancestral villages in Kottayam, they were subjected to worst forms of exploitation including caste slavery historically.  For such a people migration to the Malabar region where land was in plenty and relatively cheap offered freedom from exploitation and caste oppression. The Dalit Christian families that migrated to Karikkottakkari and adjoining areas included the Puliyankil, Chittakkattu, Parikkappillil and Vavattuthadathil.  The early 1950s also witnessed the coming of many other Dalit Christian families that included the Padikkapparampil and Pazhayakalayil, among others. Migration to Karikkottakkari enabled Dalit Christians to evolve as peasants although many of them were still marginal peasants and agricultural labourers in the early 1960s leasing in land from wealthy migrant Syrian Christians and cultivating seasonal and annual crops.  However, by the late 1960s they were able to improve their economic and social condition by owning land and transforming themselves as peasants.

Suburbs and villages
 Edappuzha, Valathode, Uruppumkutti, Valayamkode, Angadikadavu and Inthumkary are the nearest places.

Transportation
The national highway passes through Kannur town.  Mangalore and Mumbai can be accessed on the northern side and Cochin and Thiruvananthapuram can be accessed on the southern side.  The road to the east of Iritty connects to Mysore and Bangalore. The nearest railway station is Kannur on Mangalore-Palakkad line. There are airports at Mangalore and Calicut.

References

Villages near Iritty